The 1994 Eastleigh by-election was a parliamentary by-election held on 9 June 1994 for the United Kingdom House of Commons constituency of Eastleigh in Hampshire. The seat had fallen vacant because of the death of Conservative Party Member of Parliament (MP) Stephen Milligan on 7 February.

The result of the election was a gain for the Liberal Democrats on a large swing.  A disastrous result for the Conservative Party saw them fall to third place. The election, along with the EU elections and three other by-elections held that day, were the first election that the newly formed UK Independence Party (UKIP) stood in, with Nigel Farage as the candidate; Farage went on to become the leader of UKIP in 2006.

Results

Previous results

See also
 2013 Eastleigh by-election
 Eastleigh constituency
 The town of Eastleigh

References

External links
Campaign literature from the by-election

Eastleigh by-election
Eastleigh by-election
Eastleigh by-election
By-elections to the Parliament of the United Kingdom in Hampshire constituencies
Politics of the Borough of Eastleigh
1990s in Hampshire